William Stanley Carpenter Jr. (born September 30, 1937) is a retired American military officer and former college football player. While playing college football at the United States Military Academy, he gained national prominence as the "Lonesome End" of the Army football team. During his military service in the Vietnam War, he again achieved fame when he saved his company by directing airstrikes on his own position. For the action, he was awarded the Distinguished Service Cross.

Personal life
Carpenter was born in Springfield, Pennsylvania, on September 30, 1937 to William Stanley Carpenter, Sr. (1907–1945) and Helen Carpenter (née Sparks). Private First Class Carpenter, Sr. served in the United States Army as an ammunition bearer in the 393rd Infantry Regiment, 99th Infantry Division and was killed in action in the Ruhr Pocket. He is interred in Margraten, Netherlands, at the Netherlands American Cemetery. Helen remarried and relocated the family to the Philadelphia area.

Carpenter was a 1955 graduate of Springfield High School, Springfield, Pennsylvania and later attended the Manlius School (now Manlius Pebble Hill School) in Manlius, New York.

Carpenter married Toni M. Vigliotti in 1961 and had three children: William S. Carpenter III (1962), Kenneth Carpenter (1964), and Stephen Carpenter (1965).

College football career
While attending the United States Military Academy at West Point, Carpenter played as a split end on the football team, alongside Heisman Trophy-winning halfback and fellow combat infantryman Pete Dawkins.  Carpenter earned the nickname the "Lonesome End" as a result of the team's tactic of aligning him near the far sideline and leaving him outside of huddles.  He played on the undefeated 1958 West Point team, and in 1959, while team captain, was named an All-American. Legendary Army head coach Earl Blaik, who spent twenty years on the Army coaching staff, called Carpenter "the greatest end I ever coached at West Point."

In 1982, Carpenter was inducted into the College Football Hall of Fame.

Military career
Upon graduation, Carpenter was commissioned as an infantry officer and went on to serve at least two tours in Vietnam. In 1964, he was an adviser assigned to an airborne brigade of the  Army of the Republic of Vietnam. That unit came under heavy enemy fire immediately after being inserted by helicopter into a sugar cane field. Bill Carpenter was wounded by a gunshot through the arm while changing rifle magazines. His radio set was hit with another bullet and he was spun around and knocked to the ground.  He proceeded to eliminate the source of the enemy fire, by knocking out a bunker with a hand grenade. For his actions he was awarded the Silver Star, the U.S. Army's third highest award for valor in combat.

In 1966, Captain Carpenter's C Company, 2/502nd Parachute Infantry of the 101st Airborne Division took part in Operation Hawthorne, fighting North Vietnamese forces near Dak To on the Kontum plateau in the Central Highlands. As it maneuvered in an attempt to relieve Major David Hackworth's engaged 1/327th Infantry, C Company became isolated and in danger of being overrun. As the situation grew desperate, Carpenter radioed the battalion air traffic controller for a napalm airstrike on his own position: "We're overrun, they're right in among us. I need an air strike on my position." Several of his soldiers were wounded by the close air support, but it blunted the enemy attack and prevented the envelopment of his company. C Company was then able to consolidate and eventually break out. For his actions, he was again awarded the Silver Star, which was later upgraded to the U.S. Army's second highest wartime medal, the Distinguished Service Cross and earned the nickname, "Napalm Bill" Carpenter.

Carpenter committed another act of heroism on February 1, 1967, at Tan Son Nhut Air Base in Saigon when he carried an injured man to safety after a plane crash landed.  After a C-123 Provider military transport aircraft made a belly landing on the runway, Captain Carpenter "hoisted the injured man onto his shoulders and scampered from the gasoline-soaked plane."

In 1984, Carpenter went on to take command of the newly activated 10th Mountain Division and, finally, the Combined Field Army in Korea. He eventually retired as a lieutenant general and settled in Montana.

See also

 List of people with surname Carpenter

References

Additional sources
Charles Goodman, Hell's Brigade, 1966, New York, Prestige, ASIN: B000UCG92Q.

1937 births
Living people
People from Springfield Township, Delaware County, Pennsylvania
Players of American football from Pennsylvania
American football ends
Army Black Knights football players
All-American college football players
College Football Hall of Fame inductees
Lacrosse players from Pennsylvania
Army Black Knights men's lacrosse players
United States Army personnel of the Vietnam War
United States Army generals
Recipients of the Silver Star
Recipients of the Distinguished Service Cross (United States)
Sportspeople from Delaware County, Pennsylvania
Military personnel from Pennsylvania